Aiden Connor O'Neill (born 4 July 1998) is an Australian professional football player who plays as a midfielder for Melbourne City.

Born in Brisbane, O'Neill played youth football for Kenmore F.C. (now called UQFC), then Brisbane Athletic and Burnley before making his professional debut for the latter in 2016. He spent some time on loan to Oldham Athletic and Fleetwood Town, scoring his first ever professional goal for the latter club. He returned to Australia, on loan, to play for Central Coast Mariners in 2018.

He has represented the Australian under-23 national team.

Early life
O'Neill is of Irish ancestry. He was born and raised in Brisbane, attending Nudgee Junior College before moving to Brisbane Boys' College before moving to England aged fourteen when his parents moved there for work.

Career
O'Neill played youth football for Brisbane Athletic between 2008 and 2012. He moved to England as a teenager, where he sought to pursue a career in football.

On 12 January 2016, O'Neill signed his first professional contract with then-Championship side Burnley. He made his professional debut for the club on 20 August 2016, coming on as a late substitute against Liverpool in the Premier League as Burnley won 2–0. He made his full debut days later, starting in an extra time loss to Accrington Stanley in the EFL Cup.

In January 2017, he joined EFL League One strugglers Oldham Athletic on loan until the end of the season. He made a total of fifteen appearances for the Latics.

In August 2017, he joined League One side Fleetwood Town on a season-long loan deal. In January 2018, he returned to Burnley early having made twenty-seven appearances and scoring once against Blackburn Rovers.

In August 2018, O'Neill returned to Australia to play for Central Coast Mariners in the A-League on a season-long loan.

O'Neill signed a three-year deal with Melbourne City in September 2020.

International career
O'Neill has stated that his preference is to play for Australia, but had not been in any contact with Football Federation Australia when he made his Premier League debut in August 2016. He was later called up for an Australia under-23 camp in March 2017. He had previously been contacted by the Football Association of Ireland and the Irish Football Association but reiterated that his preference was to play for Australia.

Career statistics

Honours
Melbourne City
A-League Premiership: 2020-21, 2021–22
A-League Championship: 2020–21

Australia U23
AFC U-23 Championship third place: 2020

See also
 List of foreign Premier League players

References

External links
Aiden O'Neill profile  BurnleyFootballClub.com

1998 births
Living people
Burnley F.C. players
Oldham Athletic A.F.C. players
Fleetwood Town F.C. players
Central Coast Mariners FC players
Brisbane Roar FC players
Melbourne City FC players
Association football midfielders
Premier League players
English Football League players
A-League Men players
Expatriate footballers in England
Australian expatriate sportspeople in England
Australian expatriate soccer players
Soccer players from Brisbane
Australian people of Irish descent
Australian people of Northern Ireland descent
Australian soccer players